Dick Briel (born 28 December 1950, in Leiden, died in The Hague, 25 September 2011) was a Dutch comic artist living in Amsterdam who followed the Ligne claire style. He is most famous for his Professor Julius Palmboom comics. So far, three adventures were published, with a fourth left unfinished.

The first two adventures appeared in Dutch comic weekly Eppo in 1979. Two albums were published by Oberon in the 1980s, and are again available from Arboris publishers. The third adventure, London Labyrinth, appeared in the Veronica weekly TV magazine and was also published as an album.

The Professor Palmboom stories are science-fiction, dealing with things like killer plants. The second book consists of two stories. A fourth book was left "to be continued" but Ratcliffe Highway has not yet been released (see the 'A Work in Progress' website).

International editions of the Palmboom adventures include French language versions, published by the then Grenoble-based Glenat.

After several years of absence, Dick Briel reappeared in Veronica magazine as the co-writer with Ruud den Drijver of the humorous horror comic 'Max en Mummie', drawn at first by Steven Dupré (1995) and then by Wout Paulussen (1995–96).

Dick studied at the Rietveld Art Academy. Two albums were published by Oberon in the 1980s. With its Clear Line style and 1950s atmosphere, the series also found its way to the French-speaking audience.

Briel also did the comic Hulbert and wrote a few others. Another book was released called Sketches from Victorian Times, though it is not an adventure. Briel died of cancer on September 25, 2011.

Bibliography 
 Professor Julius Palmboom
 The Tacho-Plant Mystery (1981)
 The Rust Grenade (1982), includes also Phillpotts' Army
 London Labyrinth (1999)
 Ratcliffe Highway (unfinished)

External links
Dick Briel, Lambiek comciclopedia entry
 Dick Briel
A Work in Progress
 De Patathiek 
Obituary (Dutch)
Glenat publishers (French)

Artists from Leiden
Artists from Amsterdam
1950 births
2011 deaths
Dutch comics artists